Nikuyeh (also Romanized as Nīkūyeh; also known as Naki, and Nekū’yā, and Nikuya) is a village in Qaqazan-e Gharbi Rural District, in the Central District of Takestan County, Qazvin Province, Iran. At the 2006 census, its population was 1,351, in 329 families.

References 

Populated places in Takestan County